Melodies of a White Night is a 1976 romantic drama directed by Sergei Solovyov.

Plot
A Japanese pianist (Komaki Kurihara) travels to the Soviet Union to better understand the country's composers' production. She falls in love with Soviet composer Ilya (Yury Solomin), who has lost his parents in the Siege of Leningrad and also his wife during childbirth. The lovers enjoy Leningrad's white summer nights, and Ilya starts composing a piano concert inspired by Yuko. A couple of years later, they meet again in Japan in Kyoto, where Ilya is conducting his piano concert, and Yuko is the soloist. Ilya finds out that Yuko is a widow and starts to experience feelings of guilt.

Cast
Komaki Kurihara - Yuko, Japanese pianist
Yury Solomin - Ilya, composer-conductor
Aleksandr Zbruyev - Fedor, Ilya's brother, painter
Sergey Polezhaev - musician, teacher
Yelizaveta Solodova - foster mother of Ilya and Fedor, music teacher
Andrey Leontovich - Alyosha, son of Ilya
Seiji Miyaguchi

References

External links
 

Soviet romantic drama films
Japanese romantic drama films
1976 romantic drama films
Mosfilm films
1976 multilingual films
Toho films
Japan–Soviet Union relations
Japanese multilingual films
Soviet multilingual films
1976 films
1970s Japanese films